Colin Needham (born 26 January 1967) is a British computer engineer who is known as the founder and CEO of IMDb. He has been general manager of IMDb since its acquisition by Amazon in 1998.

Early life
Needham was born in Denton, Lancashire, and grew up on Stockport Road. He attended Audenshaw School and Clarendon Sixth Form College in Hyde. He graduated from the University of Leeds with a BSc (Hons) in Computer Science in 1988.

Career
IMDb was started in 1990 while Needham was working as an engineer in Bristol at Hewlett-Packard (HP). The site evolved from what was initially his personal movie database, which became an internet bulletin board made from simple records, kept on a succession of early computers and contributed to by several persons, all of whom Needham outlasted.

By the summer of 1996, thanks to IMDb's first film-related advertising campaign (for Independence Day), Needham had quit HP to work on IMDb full-time as a paid employee. In 1999, he collected two Webby Awards for IMDb. In February 2017, Needham decided to remove the message boards from IMDb, stating that the message boards "are no longer providing a positive, useful experience for the vast majority of our more than 250 million monthly users worldwide".

Personal life
Needham married Karen Gaskin in 1989. They have twin daughters and live in Filton, Gloucestershire. He is a fan of early 20th-century classical Russian composers, particularly Dmitri Shostakovich.

References

External links
 
 Col Needham interview – The Open Mind, 21 February 2015

British Internet celebrities
Businesspeople from Manchester
Amazon (company) people
1967 births
Living people
People from Denton, Greater Manchester
People from South Gloucestershire District
Alumni of the University of Leeds